Cedar County is a county located in the southwest portion of the U.S. state of Missouri. As of the 2020 census, the population was 14,188. Its county seat is Stockton. The county was founded February 14, 1845, and named after Cedar Creek, a tributary of the Sac River, which in turn is named from the Eastern red cedar, a common tree of the area.

Geography
The water area includes various rivers and Stockton Lake.

Adjacent counties
St. Clair County  (north)
Polk County  (east)
Dade County (south)
Vernon County  (west)

Major highways
 U.S. Route 54
 Route 32
 Route 39
 Route 97
 Route 215

Demographics

As of the census of 2000, there were 13,733 people, 5,685 households, and 3,894 families residing in the county.  The population density was 29 people per square mile (11/km2).  There were 6,813 housing units at an average density of 14 per square mile (6/km2).  The racial makeup of the county was 96.58% White, 0.32% Black or African American, 0.66% Native American, 0.46% Asian, 0.04% Pacific Islander, 0.50% from other races, and 1.43% from two or more races. Approximately 1.11% of the population were Hispanic or Latino of any race.

There were 5,685 households, out of which 27.80% had children under the age of 18 living with them, 57.50% were married couples living together, 7.90% had a female householder with no husband present, and 31.50% were non-families. 28.10% of all households were made up of individuals, and 15.30% had someone living alone who was 65 years of age or older.  The average household size was 2.35 and the average family size was 2.86.

In the county, the population was spread out, with 24.60% under the age of 18, 6.40% from 18 to 24, 22.80% from 25 to 44, 25.40% from 45 to 64, and 20.80% who were 65 years of age or older.  The median age was 42 years.  For every 100 females there were 95.90 males.  For every 100 females age 18 and over, there were 90.50 males.

The median income for a household in the county was $26,694, and the median income for a family was $32,710. Males had a median income of $25,017 versus $17,594 for females. The per capita income for the county was $14,356.  17.40% of the population and 11.60% of families were below the poverty line.  Out of the total population, 24.80% of those under the age of 18 and 14.20% of those 65 and older were living below the poverty line.

Religion
According to the Association of Religion Data Archives County Membership Report (2010), Cedar County is regarded as being part of the Bible Belt, with evangelical Protestantism being the most predominant religion. The most predominant denominations among residents in Cedar County who adhere to a religion are Southern Baptists (35.02%), Christian churches and churches of Christ (11.49%), and Assemblies of God (9.56%).

2020 Census

Education

Public schools
El Dorado Springs R-II School District – El Dorado Springs
El Dorado Springs Elementary School (PK-05)
El Dorado Springs Middle School (06-08)
El Dorado Springs High School (09-12)
Stockton R-I School District – Stockton
Stockton Elementary School (PK-04)
Stockton Middle School (05-08)
Stockton High School (09-12)

Private schools
Agape Boarding School – Stockton (01-12) – Baptist – Boys
El Dorado Christian School – El Dorado Springs (PK-12) – Church of God

Public libraries
Cedar County Library District

Politics

Local
The Republican Party completely controls politics at the local level in Cedar County. Republicans hold all of the elected positions in the county.

State

Cedar County is split between three of Missouri's legislative districts that elect members of the Missouri House of Representatives. All three are represented by Republicans.

District 125 — Jim Kalberloh (R-Monett). The district includes El Dorado Springs and the rest of the northern part of the county.

District 127 — Ann Kelley (R-Lamar). Consists of Jerico Springs, Umber View Heights, and the rest of the southern part of the county.

District 128 — Mike Stephens (R-Bolivar). Consists of Stockton and the rest of the center of the county.

All of Cedar County is a part of Missouri's 28th District in the Missouri Senate. The seat is currently represented by Sandy Crawford (R-Buffalo). The previous incumbent, Mike Parson was elected Lieutenant Governor in 2016, became Governor upon the resignation of Eric Greitens in 2018. Parson was elected to a full term as governor in 2020.

Federal
All of Cedar County is included in Missouri's 4th Congressional District and is currently represented by Vicky Hartzler (R-Harrisonville) in the U.S. House of Representatives. Hartzler was elected to a sixth term in 2020 over Democratic challenger Lindsey Simmons.

Cedar County, along with the rest of the state of Missouri, is represented in the U.S. Senate by Josh Hawley (R-Columbia) and Roy Blunt (R-Strafford).

Blunt was elected to a second term in 2016 over then-Missouri Secretary of State Jason Kander.

Political culture

At the presidential level, Cedar County has been solidly Republican for much of its history. Cedar County strongly favored Donald Trump in both 2016 and 2020. A Democrat hasn't carried the county in a presidential election since Franklin Roosevelt's landslide victory in 1932.

Like most rural areas throughout Missouri, voters in Cedar County generally adhere to socially and culturally conservative principles which tend to influence their Republican leanings. Despite Cedar County's longstanding tradition of supporting socially conservative platforms, voters in the county have a penchant for advancing populist causes. In 2018, Missourians voted on a proposition (Proposition A) concerning right to work, the outcome of which ultimately reversed the right to work legislation passed in the state the previous year. 51.58% of Cedar County voters cast their ballots to overturn the law.

Missouri presidential preference primaries

2020
The 2020 presidential primaries for both the Democratic and Republican parties were held in Missouri on March 10. On the Democratic side, former Vice President Joe Biden (D-Delaware) both won statewide and carried Cedar County by a wide margin. Biden went on to defeat President Donald Trump in the general election.

Incumbent President Donald Trump (R-Florida) faced a primary challenge from former Massachusetts Governor Bill Weld, but won both Cedar County and statewide by overwhelming margins.

2016
The 2016 presidential primaries for both the Republican and Democratic parties were held in Missouri on March 15. Businessman Donald Trump (R-New York) narrowly won the state overall, but Senator Ted Cruz (R-Texas) carried a plurality of the vote in Cedar County. Trump went on to win the nomination and the presidency.

On the Democratic side, former Secretary of State Hillary Clinton (D-New York) narrowly won statewide, but Senator Bernie Sanders (I-Vermont) carried Cedar County by a small margin.

2012
The 2012 Missouri Republican Presidential Primary's results were nonbinding on the state's national convention delegates. Voters in Cedar County supported former U.S. Senator Rick Santorum (R-Pennsylvania), who finished first in the state at large, but eventually lost the nomination to former Governor Mitt Romney (R-Massachusetts). Delegates to the congressional district and state conventions were chosen at a county caucus, which selected a delegation favoring Santorum. Incumbent President Barack Obama easily won the Missouri Democratic Primary and renomination. He defeated Romney in the general election.

2008
In 2008, the Missouri Republican Presidential Primary was closely contested, with Senator John McCain (R-Arizona) prevailing and eventually winning the nomination. Former Governor Mike Huckabee (R-Arkansas) won a plurality in Cedar County, receiving more votes than any other candidate of either major party.

Then-Senator Hillary Clinton (D-New York) decisively won the vote in Cedar County on the Democratic side. Despite initial reports that Clinton had won Missouri, Barack Obama (D-Illinois), also a Senator at the time, narrowly defeated her statewide and later became that year's Democratic nominee, going on to win the presidency.

Communities

Cities and Towns
Caplinger Mills
El Dorado Springs
Jerico Springs
Stockton (county seat)
Umber View Heights

Unincorporated Communities

 Arnica
 Bearcreek
 Cane Hill
 Caplinger Mills
 Cedar Springs
 Filley
 Lebeck
 Needmore
 Olympia
 Osiris
 Pacetown
 Rowland

Notable people
 Kate Austin, radical writer and anarchist
 Emil Liston, basketball coach and administrator, member of the Basketball Hall of Fame
 Eugene McCown, jazz pianist and painter

See also
National Register of Historic Places listings in Cedar County, Missouri

References

External links
Cedar County, Missouri
 Digitized 1930 Plat Book of Cedar County  from University of Missouri Division of Special Collections, Archives, and Rare Books

 
Missouri counties
1845 establishments in Missouri
Populated places established in 1845